The following highways are numbered 9E:

United States
 U.S. Route 9E (former)
 Georgia State Route 9E (former)
 New York State Route 9E (former)

See also
List of highways numbered 9